Tymon de Weger  (born 1955 in Delft) is a Dutch politician.

De Weger was an Alderman of Enschede, Utrecht and Breukelen.

References

1955 births
Living people
Aldermen in Overijssel
People from Enschede
Aldermen in Utrecht (province)
People from Breukelen
Aldermen of Utrecht
Christian Union (Netherlands) politicians
21st-century Dutch politicians
People from Delft
Reformed Churches (Liberated) Christians from the Netherlands
Reformed Political League politicians